Cephalaria anatolica, is a herbaceous plant, native to elevations of 1000 meters height.

Distribution 
It is an endemic species to Turkey.

Taxonomy 
The species was first described by Anna Schchian in: Zam. Sist. Geogr. Rast. 28: 26. in 1970.

References 

anatolica
Endemic flora of Turkey
Plants described in 1970